This is a list of genera within the beetle family Scarabaeidae.

A

 Acanthonitis
 Acoma
 Actinophorus
 Aegialia
 Aeschrotes
 Afrocanthon
 Afroharoldius
 Agamopus
 Aganhyboma
 Agestrata
 Aidophus
 Aleiantus
 Allonitis
 Altonthophagus
 Amaecylius
 Amblonoxia
 Amphiceratodon
 Amphimallon
 Amphionthophagus
 Amphistomus
 Ancognatha
 Anisocanthon
 Annegialia
 Anomalacra
 Anomala
 Anomiopsis
 Anomiopsoides
 Anonthobium
 Anonychonitis
 Anoplodrepanus
 Anoplognatho
 Aphengium
 Aphengoecus
 Aphodius
 Aphonus
 Aphotaenius
 Apotolamprus
 Aptenocanthon
 Aptychonitis
 Archophileurus
 Arrowianella
 Ataeniopsis
 Ataenius
 Ateuchus
 Atrichius
 Augosoma
 Aulacium
 Aulacopris
 Australaphodius

B

 Baloghonthobium
 Bdelyropsis
 Bdelyrus
 Bohepilissus
 Bolbites
 Boletoscapter
 Boreocanthon
 Boucomontius
 Byrrhidium

C

 Caccobiomorphus
 Caccocnemus
 Caccophilus
 Caeconthobium
 Caelius
 Caelontherus
 Calhyboma
 Callistethus
 Cambefortantus
 Canthidium
 Canthochilum
 Canthodimorpha
 Canthonella
 Canthonidia
 Canthonosoma
 Canthon
 Canthotrypes
 Cartwrightia
 Catharsiocopris
 Cephalodesmius
 Cetonia
 Chalcocopris
 Chalconotus
 Chalcosoma
 Cheirolasia
 Cheirotonus
 Chironitis
 Chlorixanthe
 Chnaunanthus
 Chrysina
 Coenonycha
 Colobonthophagus
 Copridaspidus
 Copris
 Coprobius
 Coprocanthon
 Coprophanaeoides
 Coprophanaeus
 Coptorrhina
 Coscinocephalus
 Cotalpa
 Cotinis
 Cremastocheilus
 Cryptocanthon
 Cyclocephala
 Cyptochirus

D

 Deltepilissus
 Deltochilum
 Deltohyboma
 Demarziella
 Dendropaemon
 Deronitis
 Diaglyptus
 Dialytellus
 Dialytes
 Diapterna
 Diasomus
 Dichelonyx
 Dichotomius
 Digitonthophagus
 Dinacoma
 Diorygopyx
 Diplotaxis
 Drepanocerus
 Drepanoplatynus
 Dynastes
 Dyscinetus

E

 Elassocanthon
 Endrodius
 Endroedyantus
 Enicotarsus
 Ennearabdus
 Epactoides
 Epilissus
 Epionitis
 Epirinus
 Eremonthophagus
 Eucanthidium
 Eucranium
 Eudicella
 Eudinopus
 Euetheola
 Euhyboma
 Euoniticellus
 Euparia
 Euparixia
 Euphoria
 Eurypodea
 Eurysternodes
 Eutrichillum

F

 Falsignambia
 Formicdubius
 Fossocarus
 Francmonrosia
 Frankenbergerius
 Freyus
 Furconthophagus

G

 Genuchinus
 Geopsammodius
 Gibbonthophagus
 Gilletellus
 Glaphyocanthon
 Glaphyrocanthon
 Glyphoderus
 Gnorimella
 Goliathus
 Goniocanthon
 Gromphas
 Gronocarus
 Gymnetina
 Gymnetis
 Gymnopyge

H

 Hammondantus
 Haroldiataenius
 Hemiphileurus
 Hologymnetis
 Hoplia
 Hornietus
 Hypothyce
  Hypotrichia

I

 Isonychus

L

 Leiopsammodius
 Leptohoplia
 Liatongus
 Lissomelas

M

 Macrodactylus
 Maladera
 Malagoniella
 Martineziana
 Mecynorhina
 Megasoma
 Melanocanthon
 Micraegialia
 Mnematidium
 Mnematium
 Monoplistes

N

 Neateuchus
 Neocanthidium
 Neonitis
 Neopachysoma
 Neopsammodius
 Nesocanthon
 Nesosisyphus
 Nesovinsonia
 Nipponoserica
 Notiophanaeus
 Notopedaria
 Nudipleurus

O

 Odontolytes
 Odontopsammodius
 Oncerus
 Onitis
 Ontherus
 Onthoecus
 Onthocharis
 Onthophagiellus
 Onthophagus
 Orizabus
 Osmoderma
 Oxygrylius
 Oxyomus

P

 Pachnoda
 Parabyrsopolis
 Paracotalpa
 Parapsammodius
 Parastasia
 Parataenius
 Pelidnota
 Phanaeus
 Phileurus
 Phobetus
 Phyllophaga
 Platytomus
 Plectris
 Plectrodes
 Pleurophorus
 Podolasia
 Podostena
 Polyphylla
 Popillia
 Protaetia
 Psammodius
 Pseudataenius
 Pseudocanthon
 Pseudocotalpa
 Pseudotorynorrhina
 Psilocnemis

R

 Rhysothorax
 Rhyssemus
 Rutela

S

 Scarabaeus
 Serica
 Stephanorrhina
 Strategus
 Strigoderma

T

 Taurhina
 Tesarius
 Thyce
 Tomarus
 Trichiorhyssemus
 Trichiotinus
 Trigonopeltastes

V

 Valgus

W

 Warwickia

X

 Xeropsamobeus
 Xyloryctes
 Xylotrupes

Scarabaeidae
Scarabaeidae